Gary S. Sy, popularly known as Dr. Gary Sy, is a medical practitioner, television host, radio broadcaster, columnist, and author in the Philippines. He is one of the few doctors specializing in Geriatric Medicine in the country.

Education

Sy obtained a Bachelor of Science in Medical Technology in 1987 from the Far Eastern University in Manila. He attended the Fatima College of Medicine in Valenzuela, and earned a Doctor of Medicine degree in 1992.

He entered the Medical Technology Internship Program at the Clark Air Base in the United States Air Force Regional Medical Center in 1987. Sy attained his medical clerical scholarship training in Gastroenterology and General Surgery at the Brooklyn Medical Center, New York, in 1991. He took postgraduate courses in Occupational Health and Safety at the University of the Philippines College of Public Health in 1994; Sports Medicine and Family Medicine at the University of Santo Tomas Faculty of Medicine and Surgery in 1996; Gerontology and Geriatrics at the Philippine College of Gerontology and Geriatrics and in Bucharest, Romania, in 1999.

Career

Sy is the medical director of the Life Extension Medical Center, a medium-sized clinic rendering free services to indigent patients in the country. The center was awarded as the Most Outstanding Geriatric Treatment Center by the Parangal ng Bayan Foundation's The Who's Who in the Philippines Awards on September 17, 2001, at the Philam Life Theater in Manila.

He has been the vice president of the Philippine College of Gerontologist & Geriatrics and a medical consultant of the Philippine United Senior Citizen Association (PUSCA).

Medical leadership and advocacy

Sy is the medical director of the Life Extension Medical Center located in the Garden Plaza Hotel in Manila. He travels throughout the Philippines and abroad, delivering free lectures on important health issues and rendering free medical consultations to the general public. He is particularly interested in addressing the concerns of the old and individuals dealing with senility.

Broadcasting

Sy used to host a regular health television show in RPN-9 through his Saturday weekly program entitled Kalusugan TV (Health TV) April – October 2006.[1] He appears regularly in several radio programs in Metro Manila, including: DZRH (666 kHz) "LUNAS" every Mondays, Wednesdays & Fridays 7:30 pm to 8:30 pm.

Publishing

Sy has authored two medical books, Gabay sa Kalusugan: Part I (December 2003), and Gabay sa Kalusugan: Part II (December 2006). He is a regular contributor in several national dailies: the Manila Bulletin Life Extension every Wednesday; People's Journal Sunday Tonight Gabay sa Kalusugan every Sunday; and BizNews Asia Magazine, a weekly issue.

Awards

Sy has received numerous awards as a medical practitioner and broadcaster. including:

1998
Most Outstanding Sports Medicine Physician award from the Federation of Filipino Consumers, Inc.
Most Outstanding Young Leader Award from the Development of Filipino Youth, Inc.
1999
Young Professional Awardee in Medicine and Allied Services from the Dr. Jose Rizal Awards
Outstanding Young Professional Award in Medicine & Allied Sciences from the Parangal ng Bayan Awards
2000
Outstanding Young Professional Award in Medicine & Allied Sciences from the Parangal ng Bayan Awards
Outstanding Young Gerontologist of the Philippines from the Kapatiran Awards
Outstanding Physician of the Year from the Best in Service Asia Pacific Out-Reach Development, Inc.
Humanitarian Award from the Philippine United Senior Citizen Association (PUSCA)
Andres Bonifacio Grand Achievement Awardee during the 2nd Annual Mabuhay Filipino Achievers Gawad Parangal
2001
Outstanding Young Professional Award in Medicine & Allied Sciences from the Parangal ng Bayan Awards
Humanitarian Award from the Philippine United Senior Citizen Association (PUSCA)
Huwarang Pilipino Awardee for Medicine & Allied Sciences from the Top Men and Women of the New Millennium and Parangal ng Bayan Awards
 Physician of the Philippines from the Media Special Awards of the Philippine Media Enforcers, Inc.
2002
Outstanding Young Professional Award in Medicine & Allied Sciences from the Parangal ng Bayan Awards
2005
Best Educational Radio Program from the Catholic Mass Media (CMMA)
2006
KBP Golden Dove Awardee 2006 for Best Public Service Program- Kalusugan TV RPN 9
2010
2010 Dangal ng Bayan Award – Humanitarian Services for the Elderly
2010 Seal of Excellence Award – Outstanding Geriatric Medicine Practitioner
2010 Seal of Excellence Award – Best radio Health Adviser and Life Extension Medical Center
2010 Seal of Excellence Award – Best Geriatric Center

References 

Filipino geriatricians
Filipino educators
Filipino radio journalists
Filipino television journalists
Filipino writers
People from Manila
RPN News and Public Affairs people
Living people
Far Eastern University alumni
University of the Philippines alumni
University of Santo Tomas alumni
21st-century Filipino medical doctors
Year of birth missing (living people)